Radoma  Court was designed in 1937 by the Harold Le Roith practice of architects. It is situated prominently on a corner site in Bellevue, at stand 474 where Cavendish and Yeo Streets meet.

At the time of construction, it was considered the most important block of flats in the international style of the modern movement.  Clive Chipkin describes Radoma Court as ‘a stunning building’ and it has gained iconic status.

A corner building, Radoma Court has its facade on the South and West boundaries of Cavendish and Yeo streets in Bellevue, Gauteng. Erected prior to the war, the building comprises 27 flats, of which 4 have two bedrooms and the rest are bachelor flats, and a basement parking garage. The building has been published both in South Africa and overseas and is regarded by student and architects as iconic.

Design
Radoma Court occupies a corner site with street frontages on the south and west sides. This situation imposes difficult problems in orientation, out of which emerged the articulated plan and hence the lively three-dimensional composition of the building.

The main theme is the contrast between the sun-soaked west facade and the shaded southern elevation. On the south elevation, continuous banded windows are possible, while on the west, the necessity for protection has resulted in a deeply recessed treatment, in which the balcony fronts lie behind the main face of the building, defined by the broad horizontal bands top and bottom, and the connecting vertical piers. These two contrasting elevations are moulded together in the composition by the soaring stair tower with its curved face of sparkling glass brick. Its articulation from the western block gives emphasis to its verticality and its subtle curve ties it to the south wall.

Construction
The four storey building is constructed of reinforced concrete frame with brick walls, which were plastered smooth and painted white to give a sleek, minimalist appearance. The staircase tower has a distinctive full height glass brick window panel and the building has a flat reinforced concrete roof. The windows are steel framed hung on pivots and with casements.

The design utilizes the sloping topography of the site, gaining useful basement space from the decrease in ground level from the entrance corner. The entrance itself is a covered area acting like an extension of the public street and can be approached from either Yeo Street or Cavendish Road. Slender concrete columns sit on the horizontal ground floor slab and support the overhang to the entrance.
In the north-east corner of the site there is a garden court with flower beds and pool, and on the roof a solarium and loggia with planting boxes is provided.

Internally, each dwelling had a customized kitchen, bathroom and built in fittings. Clever space planning created compact living areas that were also spacious due to the use of built in fittings. Artisan craftsmanship delivered high quality interiors using materials such as oak floor boards. Social space was generously proportioned and the shared amenities were carefully considered so as to maintain privacy whilst also encouraging social interaction between the residents.

International Style
Erected prior to the First World War, at the time of its construction it was considered the most important block of flats in the international style of the modern movement. When Radoma Court was finished in 1937 it was the most remarkable building that Johannesburg had ever seen. It brought South Africa into the mainstream of modern architecture.

The International Style is characterized by asymmetrical composition, an absence of mouldings, large windows in horizontal bands and a predilection for white rendering. The influence of Le Courbusier, the leading French architect at that time, can be seen all over Radoma Court, from the curved stair-tower with glass-brick end wall to the precision of large square inset windows in blank walls.

This is the most important example of a flat building in the “International” style outside the central area. It marks the highest point in the flat building work of the architect Harold le Roith, which had a great influence on flat building in Johannesburg. Strong plastic handling of building masses is evidenced, in which the varying functions of the parts of the building are expressed. Originally, colour contrast enhanced this effect:

Deep blue face brick with white recessed horizontal joints forms the wall of the basement garage which is entered at the northwest corner of the site. Pale blue balcony recesses, fawn squaring on the parapets, and the wire mesh parapets are white. The south wall is pale blue with white window frames. The entrance porch is in a deep plum colour on a rough textured plaster on which the name of the building in white lettering is fixed. The squared panel is grey, doors are white and the floor black.

These were bold colour choices, emphasizing the depth of the recesses and entrance overhang. White balcony mesh panels would have stood out against the pale blue recesses and the white lettering in the entrance porch would have had even stronger contrast on the plum walls there. On the roof, the solarium walls were painted a more subtle ‘Eau-de-Nil’ colour which appears as different shades of green in varied sunlight conditions.

The original polychromatic appearance of the building has been lost in later maintenance cycles making extensive use of white paint.

Recent history
In recent years most buildings around Radoma Court were hijacked or left in a state of neglect due to white flight.

In 2014, the owner needed to repair the roof and decided to build an additional storey at the same time. But they did not obtain consent from the City of Johannesburg or the Provincial Heritage Resource Agency in Gauteng. Plans were submitted for the alteration but works commenced whilst waiting for approval. Stop notices were issued but these were ignored and works continued. This action by the owner without the necessary permissions from the City of Johannesburg and the PHRAG caused local outcry.

Heritage Status
The Radoma Court building is a protected historic monument for the following reasons:
 Radoma Court is the most important Modern Movement/International Style building in Johannesburg
 Radoma Court is an early example of a block of flats in an area of small houses
 Radoma Court is a building of high architectural quality and expresses the functions of the interior through the varied treatment of recesses on the elevations 
 Radoma Court has high representative value in that it is instantly recognizable as being of the International Style and a specific period in architectural design
 Radoma Court is significant as an important surviving building designed by the renowned practice of Harold Le Roith
 The building is of sufficient age to qualify as a heritage building
 Whilst heavily altered, Radoma Court retains much of its original fabric and character

References

Buildings and structures in Johannesburg
Heritage Buildings in Johannesburg